Salehan (also Romanized as Şāleḩān; also known as Salhūn and Sālihūn) is a village in Tavabe-e Kojur Rural District, Kojur District, Nowshahr County, Mazandaran Province, Iran. At the 2006 census, its population was 412, in 127 families.

References 

Populated places in Nowshahr County